The 2019–20 season was Al-Batin's 41st year in their existence and their first back season in the MS League. Al-Batin were relegated to the second tier of Saudi football after finishing 15th in the 2018–19 Saudi Pro League. The club participated in the MS League and the King Cup.

The season covered the period from 1 July 2019 to 20 September 2020.

Players

Squad information

Transfers and loans

Transfers in

Loans in

Transfers out

Pre-season

Competitions

Overview

Goalscorers

Last Updated: 20 September 2020

Clean sheets

Last Updated: 15 September 2020

References

Al Batin FC seasons
Batin